Earl Reece Stadtman NAS (November 15, 1919 – January 7, 2008) was an American biochemist,
notable for his research of enzymes
and anaerobic bacteria.
Stadtman received the National Medal of Science from President Jimmy Carter in 1979 "for seminal contributions to understanding of the energy metabolism of anaerobic bacteria and for elucidation of major mechanisms whereby the rates of metabolic processes are finely matched to the requirements of the living cell."
Stadtman was chief of the Laboratory of Biochemistry at the National Heart Institute.
Stadtman was also a member of the National Academy of Sciences.
The Washington Post called Stadtman a "revered biochemist." He was the husband of Thressa Stadtman, who discovered selenocysteine.

Chronology 
 1919: born in Carrizozo, New Mexico
 1942: B.S. in soil science, the University of California, Berkeley
 1949: Ph.D., the University of California, Berkeley
 1953: Pfizer Award in Enzyme Chemistry
 1969: elected to the National Academy of Sciences
 1970: awarded Selman A. Waksman Award in Microbiology
 1979: National Medal of Science from President Jimmy Carter
 1991: Welch Award in Chemistry

References

External links

1919 births
2008 deaths
University of California, Berkeley alumni
Members of the United States National Academy of Sciences
National Medal of Science laureates
People from Lincoln County, New Mexico
Scientists from New Mexico
20th-century American biochemists
National Institutes of Health people